This is a list of statutory listed pubs in Birmingham, West Midlands, England.

See also
Grade I listed buildings in the West Midlands#Birmingham
Grade II* listed buildings in the West Midlands#Birmingham

References

Birmingham, West Midlands-related lists
Listed pubs
Birmingham, pubs
Birmingham, pubs
 Pubs
Pubs in Birmingham, West Midlands
Grade II listed pubs in Birmingham
 Birmingham
Birm